Péter Tóth may refer to:

 Péter Tóth (fencer) (1882–1967), Hungarian sabre and foil fencer
 Peter Wolf Toth (born 1947), Hungarian-born American sculptor
 Peter Toth (chess player), Brazilian chess player
 Péter Tóth (footballer, born 1977), Hungarian footballer
 Péter Tóth (footballer, born 1989), Hungarian footballer
 Péter Tóth (footballer, born 2001), Hungarian footballer
 Péter Tóth (pianist) (born 1983), Hungarian pianist